Rothschildia jorulla is a species of moth in the family Saturniidae first described by John O. Westwood in 1854. This species is found in Mexico and Central America. Larvae feed on plants of a large number of families.

Subspecies
Rothschildia jorulla jorulla
Rothschildia jorulla lichtenba Dyar, 1912

References

Moths described in 1854
Jorulla